The 2004 Oceania Swimming Championships were held May 15–19, 2004 at the National Aquatics Center in Suva, Fiji. This was the fifth edition of the Championships, and featured competitions in: swimming, open water swimming and synchronized swimming (synchro). The synchro competition marked the first time the sport had been swum in Fiji.

All swimming competition listed below were swum in a 50m (long-course) pool.

Participating countries
The 2004 Oceania Swimming Championships featured 134 swimmers from 11 countries, and the USA State of Hawaii:

 (4)
 (35)
 (2)
 (10)
 (4)
 (4)
 (24)
 (41)
 (2)
 (1)
 (3)
 (4)

Event schedule

 (*) Semifinals were held in the events 50 and 100 in length. 50 semifinals were held the same evening as their final; 100 semifinals were held the evening before the final.

Results

Swimming

Men

Women

Open Water medalist

Synchro medalists

Overall medal table

References

Oceania Swimming Championships, 2004
2004 in Fiji
Oceania Swimming Championships, 2004
Oceania Swimming Championships
Swimming competitions in Fiji
International sports competitions hosted by Fiji
May 2004 sports events in Oceania